Common Touch is an album by jazz saxophonist Stanley Turrentine featuring Shirley Scott recorded for the Blue Note label in 1968 and performed by Turrentine with Shirley Scott, Jimmy Ponder, Bob Cranshaw and Leo Morris. The CD reissue added one bonus track recorded in a different session and originally released on Ain't No Way (LT 1095, 1980). The other four tracks may be found on the CD reissue of Easy Walker.

Reception

The Allmusic review by Scott Yanow, awarded the album 3 stars and states "Although not essential (no one seems to sweat much and none of the tempos are above a slow-medium pace), this lazy date has its pleasurable moments".

Track listing
All compositions by Stanley Turrentine except as noted
 "Buster Brown" - 5:25
 "Blowin' in the Wind" (Bob Dylan) - 5:55
 "Lonely Avenue" (Doc Pomus) - 8:07
 "Boogaloo" (Shirley Scott) - 6:25
 "Common Touch" - 6:21
 "Living Through It All" - 7:17
 "Ain't No Way" (Carolyn Franklin) - 11:03 Bonus track on CD

Recorded on May 10, 1968 (7) and August 30, 1968 (1-6).

Personnel
Stanley Turrentine - tenor saxophone
Shirley Scott - organ
Jimmy Ponder - guitar
Bob Cranshaw - electric bass
Leo Morris - drums (tracks 1-6)
Ray Lucas - drums (track 7)

References

1969 albums
Stanley Turrentine albums
Shirley Scott albums
Blue Note Records albums
Albums recorded at Van Gelder Studio
Albums produced by Francis Wolff